William Patrick Sandifer (born January 5, 1952) is a former professional American football player who played defensive lineman for five seasons for the San Francisco 49ers and Seattle Seahawks.

References 

1952 births
Living people
People from Quantico, Virginia
Players of American football from Virginia
American football defensive tackles
American football defensive ends
UCLA Bruins football players
San Francisco 49ers players
Seattle Seahawks players